Snellenius is a genus of braconid wasps in the family Braconidae. There are more than 40 described species in Snellenius, found in Asia, Oceania, and the Neotropics.

Species
These 42 species belong to the genus Snellenius:

 Snellenius atratus Shenefelt, 1968
 Snellenius basalis (Walker, 1874)
 Snellenius bicolor Shenefelt, 1968
 Snellenius billburgeri Fernandez-Triana & Whitfield, 2015
 Snellenius bobdressleri Fernandez-Triana & Whitfield, 2015
 Snellenius clavitergum Austin & Dangerfield, 1993
 Snellenius donstonei Fernandez-Triana & Whitfield, 2015
 Snellenius felipechavarriai Fernandez-Triana & Whitfield, 2015
 Snellenius gelleus Nixon, 1965
 Snellenius gerardoherrerai Fernandez-Triana & Whitfield, 2015
 Snellenius guizhouensis Luo & You, 2005
 Snellenius hippotionus Austin & Dangerfield, 1993
 Snellenius irenebakerae Fernandez-Triana & Whitfield, 2015
 Snellenius isidrochaconi Fernandez-Triana & Whitfield, 2015
 Snellenius johnkressi Fernandez-Triana & Whitfield, 2015
 Snellenius jorgecampabadali Fernandez-Triana & Whitfield, 2015
 Snellenius jorgegomezlauritoi Fernandez-Triana & Whitfield, 2015
 Snellenius josesarukhani Fernandez-Triana & Whitfield, 2015
 Snellenius kerrydresslerae Fernandez-Triana & Whitfield, 2015
 Snellenius latigenus Luo & You, 2005
 Snellenius lucindamcdadeae Fernandez-Triana & Whitfield, 2015
 Snellenius luisdiegogomezi Fernandez-Triana & Whitfield, 2015
 Snellenius maculipennis (Szépligeti, 1900)
 Snellenius mariakuzminae Fernandez-Triana & Whitfield, 2015
 Snellenius mariamartachavarriae Fernandez-Triana & Whitfield, 2015
 Snellenius nigellus Long & van Achterberg, 2013
 Snellenius peruensis Shenefelt, 1968
 Snellenius phildevriesi Fernandez-Triana & Whitfield, 2015
 Snellenius philippinensis (Ashmead, 1904)
 Snellenius quiricojimenezi Fernandez-Triana & Whitfield, 2015
 Snellenius radicalis (Wilkinson, 1929)
 Snellenius robertoespinozai Fernandez-Triana & Whitfield, 2015
 Snellenius sandyknappae Fernandez-Triana & Whitfield, 2015
 Snellenius sedlaceki Austin & Dangerfield, 1993
 Snellenius similis Long & van Achterberg, 2013
 Snellenius theretrae (Watanabe, 1937)
 Snellenius tricolor Shenefelt, 1968
 Snellenius velvaruddae Fernandez-Triana & Whitfield, 2015
 Snellenius vickifunkae Fernandez-Triana & Whitfield, 2015
 Snellenius vollenhovii Westwood, 1882
 Snellenius warrenwagneri Fernandez-Triana & Whitfield, 2015
 † Snellenius succinalis Brues, 1933

References

Microgastrinae